Veronica Stele (born 19 November 1977) is a former professional tennis player from Argentina.

Career highlights
On 19 May 1997, Stele reached her highest singles ranking of world No. 237. Her career-high doubles ranking came on 7 July 1997, when she became world No. 117. In her career, she won two singles and 11 doubles titles on the ITF Circuit.

ITF doubles titles
In 1997, Stele and her partner Katalin Marosi won the doubles title at the $50k tournament at Budapest, Hungary, and the $50k event at Marseille, France.

ITF Circuit finals

Singles: 6 (2–4)

Doubles: 23 (11–12)

Basque pelota
At the 2011 Pan American Games in Guadalajara, Mexico, Stele partnered with María Lis García to win the gold medal in Basque pelota.

References

External links
 
 

1977 births
Living people
Argentine female tennis players
Players of Basque pelota
Pan American Games medalists in basque pelota
Pan American Games gold medalists for Argentina
Medalists at the 2011 Pan American Games
Basque pelota in Argentina